Jagadguru Shri Kripalu Ji Maharaj (5 October 1922 – 15 November 2013) was the fifth original Jagadguru in Indian history.

He was the founder of Jagadguru Kripalu Parishat (JKP), a worldwide Hindu non-profit organization with five main ashrams, four in India and one in the United States.

He was awarded the title of Jagadguru (world teacher) by Kashi Vidvat Parishat on Makar Sankranti (January 14, 1957).

Childhood
Jagadguru Kripalu Ji Maharaj was born on 5 October 1922 during the auspicious full moon night of Sharat Purnima in Mangarh (known today as Bhakti Dham), a tiny village in Pratapgarh district, Uttar Pradesh state in North India. His mother was Shrimati Bhagwati Devi and his father was Shri Lalta Prasad Tripathi, who was a pious Brahmin.

Early Life before Jagadguru 
He started his primary education in the neighborhood school and started learning Hindi and Sanskrit. At the early age of thirteen, he left his village Mangarh to study to attend Peeli Kothi Sanskrit School in Chitrakoot in 1935.

Jagadguru 

In 1955, Kripalu Ji Maharaj organized a religious convention for prominent spiritual leaders in India. Mahamahopadhyay Giridhar Sharma, President of the Kashi Vidvat Parishat had also come and was impressed by Kripalu's scriptural knowledge. Kripalu Ji was invited to give discourse for ten consecutive days on scriptures philosphy at the Kashi Vidvat Parishat in 1957. Kashi Vidvat Parishat was the elite body of 500 topmost scholars of Vedic literature who collectively represented the seat of spiritual learning.

The congregation had scholars from Varanasi and other parts of India. Shri Maharaj Ji spoke for seven days revealing the secrets of the Hindu scriptures. , He reconciled the apparent contradictions between the various Vedic scriptures, and the differences between the views of the previous Jagadgurus, to reveal the true path to God-realisation for the welfare of all humankind. With profound admiration, the scholars accepted that his knowledge was deeper than the combined knowledge of all 500 of them put together. They unanimously acclaimed him as Jagadguru, the Spiritual Master of the world. They further added that he was “Jagadguruttam,” or Supreme amongst all the Jagadgurus. . He was 34 years old when given the title on January 14, 1957 by the Kashi Vidvat Parishat, the distinguished and exclusive organization of 500 Vedic scholars. The Kashi Vidvat Parishat also conferred on him the titles Bhaktiyog-Ras-Avtar and Jagadguruttam.

Shri Kripalu Ji was given the title of Jagadguru in 1957, prior to him there were four original Jagadgurus i.e. Śrīpāda Śaṅkarācārya (788–820), Śrīpāda Rāmānujācārya (1017–1137), Śrī Nimbārkācārya and, Śrīpāda Madhvācārya (1239–1319), he was known as the "fifth original Jagadguru". He was also awarded, by the Kashi Vidvat Parishat, the title Samanvaya-Acharya, i.e., He analyses and reconciles the meaning of all the scriptures, the six philosophies and the (seemingly contradictory) teachings of other previous Jagadgurus.

Life after Jagadguru 
After accepting the title of Jagadguru, Shri Kripalu Ji Maharaj traveled throughout India continuously for around fourteen years between 1957 to 1971. He delivered month-long discourses in various cities, in which He revealed the mysteries of the scriptures before tens of thousands of people. Masses gathered at the venue for a glimpse of this extraordinary scholar and Saint whose words left them spellbound.

Since that time, He continued to spread the knowledge and shower the nectar of Divine Love and Bliss. Shri Maharaj Ji’s lectures tantalized the masses with knowledge, humour, everyday examples and practical instructions, and delighted people of any age, language or country. It was a unique experience as He made the deepest scriptural truths accessible to everyone in the simplest language. His penetrative words had such divine power that even an atheist’s heart melted when Shri Maharaj Ji described the nature of the ultimate and absolute truth.

Shri Kripalu ji Maharaj composed thousands of bhajans and kirtans that evoke devotional sentiments within the heart. Topmost amongst them is ‘Prem Ras Madira’, a collection of 1008 devotional songs that has been highly praised by well-known poets of India. His book on philosophy, ‘Prem Ras Siddhant’ explains the ultimate aim of the individual soul, and sheds light on the importance of attaining divine grace and the indispensability of surrendering to a Saint. Shri Maharaj Ji has graced us with several other bhajan books such as Braj Ras Madhuri, Yugal Madhuri, Yugal Shatak, Bhakti Shatak, Yugal Ras, Shyama Shyam Geet, Radha Govind Geet, Krishna Dwadashi and Radha Trayodashi.

During his lifetime, he personally trained more than 50 Pracharaks, male and female monastic disciples. They continue to travel in India and around the world as His ordained representatives, the most authentic and sacred wisdom contained in our scriptures, as revealed and explained by Jagadguru Sri Kripalu ji Maharaj. Along with their lectures and Sri Maharajji's televised and online lectures, his teachings have spread all over the world.

Accolades By Kashi Vidvat Parishat

Shrimatpadavakya - pramanaparavarina
Jagadguru Shri Kripalu Ji Maharaj not only validated His teachings and discourses to be the only true eternal philosophy of God by citing the Vedas and the Vedic Scriptures, but He also revealed and explained the facts and intricate secrets buried in these Divine Scriptures in the simplest manner through everyday examples experienced by individual souls, that would otherwise be incomprehensible for an ordinary person.

Vedmargpratisthapanacharya
The Vedas are the topmost treasure amongst all scriptures in the Hindu religion and are eternal, boundless and are in fact the Divine words of God Himself. Jagadguru Shri Kripalu Ji Maharaj manifested the quintessence of all Vedic Scriptures by revealing and establishing the easiest path to God Realisation – the true goal of every individual soul.

Sanatanavaidikadharma - pratishthapanasatsampradaya - paramacharya
Jagadguru Shri Kripalu Ji Maharaj neither made any disciples nor did He form any ethnic group. With due respect to all existing philosophies and religions in the world today, He established selfless devotion to Radha-Krishna as the only true eternal path for the individual souls to attain the ultimate goal of life – God Realisation.

Nikhiladarshana - samanvayacharya
Jagadguru Shri Kripalu Ji Maharaj validated all existing philosophies of Spiritual Masters from the past, and at the same time, He presented His own philosophy in the simplest form, which reconciled all contradictory viewpoints and discrepancies found in the existing philosophies and scriptural teachings.

Bhaktiyogarasavatar
Jagadguru Shri Kripalu Ji Maharaj not only had complete authority over the Vedas and the Vedic Scriptures, but was also the embodiment of Divine Love Bliss, and hence was honoured with the title of “Bhaktiyogarasavatar”. In the current dark age (Kaliyuga), He made the Divine Love of Radha-Krishna flow into even the most sinful hearts, proving Him to be Bhaktiyogarasavatar (an embodiment of Divine Love Bliss).

Works

Jagadguru Kripalu Parishat 
Jagadguru Kripalu Parishat (JKP) is a charitable religious organization in India. It was established in 1970 by Jagadguru Shri Kripalu Ji Maharaj. it works tirelessly to disseminate the teachings of Jagadguru Shri Kripalu Ji Maharaj throughout the world.

Philosophical books 

Prem Rasa Siddhant – 'Prem Ras Siddhant' or 'The Philosophy of Divine Love', a popular book written by Shri Maharaj Ji contains the gist of all the teachings of our scriptures.The philosophy of Divine love  was first published (in Hindi) in 1955. Later, it was published is several other languages of India. It has been described as an "incredible book" by Swami Sivananda among others.
Bhakti Shatak – The concise philosophy of the Upaniṣats, Gītā, Brahma sūtras and the Śrīmad Bhāgavatam in an easy to understand style.
Radha Govind Geet – Printed in two volumes, with 11,111 couplets of Radha Krishna leelas and the devotional philosophy.
Ras Panchadhyayi –  Represents a series of discourses given on the esoteric of subject of Raas Leela.

Kirtans 

Prem Ras Madira – 1008 songs ("pad") of Radha-Krishna Leelas, Devotional Philosophy and humility.
Braj Ras Madhuri (Part 1 , Part 2 , Part 3 , Part 4 ) – Printed in four parts, hundreds of kirtans dedicated to Radha-Krishna, Sita-Ram, and others.
Yugal Shatak – One hundred "kirtans" of Radha Rani and Krishna.
Yugal Rasa – Kirtans of Radha Krishna.
Shri Krishna Dwadashi and Shri Radha Trayodashi – Twelve "padas" which fully describe the beauty and the decorations of Krishna. And thirteen "padas" about the beauty and the decorations of Radha Rani.

Teachings 

According to Jagadguru Shri Kripalu ji Maharaj, "the desired goal of the soul is to attain the selfless Divine love of Radha Krishna who are eternally related to you". He taught that Radha Krishna are the supreme 'form' of God and the 'form' of Divine Love and are eternally related to us.

Roopdhyan - Unique Meditation Technique - This is Shri Kripaluj ji Maharaj's extra-ordinary gift to humankind. Shri Maharaj Ji has emphasised the visualisation of the form of God during worship and meditation. Without visualisation, even if the senses are involved in worship, the mind wanders - nullifying the results of the worship. Shri Maharajji has taught that God notes the worship by the mind, not the senses.

TV discourses 

Jagadguru Shri Kripalu Ji Maharaj's discourses are broadcast daily on several religious TV channels, including DD India, Aastha TV, Sadhna TV, IBN 7, News24 and Sanskar TV. In the United States, his discourses are also broadcast everyday on TV Asia. In his TV discourses, Kripalu ji quotes the chapter and verse of almost everything he cites from the scriptures.

YouTube channel 

Two of his longest lecture series are available on the official YouTube channel, JKP Vedic:
Brahm Jeev Maya Tattva Gyan
Main Kaun Mera Kaun
Jagadguru Shri Kripalu Ji Maharaj - Official

Ashrams and temples 

Jagadguru Shri Kripalu Ji Maharaj was the founder and preceptor of Jagadguru Kripalu Parishat (JKP), a worldwide Hindu non-profit religious organization with four main ashrams in India, (Rangeeli Mahal, Barsana; Bhakti Dham, Mangarh; Shyama Shyam Dham, Vrindavan and Jagadguru Dham, Vrindavan) and one in the USA (Radha Madhav Dham, Austin). Besides these 5 main ashrams, Jagadguru Kripalu Parishat has established a number of teacher centres in Australia, Canada, Denmark, Fiji Island, Hong Kong, New Zealand, Nepal, Ireland, Scotland, Singapore, Trinidad, West Indies, United Kingdom and in many cities throughout India and USA. The organization also publishes a Hindi magazine, Sadhan Sadhya, three times a year, as well as a monthly newsletter.

He also established three temples. – Shri Raseshwari Radha Rani Temple, Austin; Bhakti Mandir, Mangarh; Prem Mandir, Vrindavan

Bhakti Mandir Mangarh 
Bhakti Mandir Mangarh is a Hindu Temple located in tehsil Kunda district Pratapgarh.This temple was established by the Jagadguru Shri Kripalu Ji Maharaj in November 2005. It is maintained by  Jagadguru Kripalu Parishat, a non-profit, charitable, educational and spiritual organisation.

Prem Mandir 

Prem Mandir is a religious and spiritual complex in Vrindavan. Construction of Prem Mandir began in January 2001 and the inauguration ceremony took place from 15 to 17 February 2012. The temple was opened to public on 17 February 2012. The cost was 150 crore rupees ($23 million). 30,000 tons of Italian marble, carved with specialized KUKA robotic machines, have been used in the construction. The presiding deity are Shri Radha Govind (Radha Krishna) and Shri Sita Ram. A 73,000 square feet, pillar-less, dome shaped satsang hall is being constructed next to Prem Mandir, which will accommodate 25,000 people at a time.

Kirti Mandir Barsana 

Kirti Mandir is dedicated to Divine mother of Shri Radharani, Kirti Mayia Mandir is unique in its own way located at Barsana, the only temple on the world having the glimpses of Shri Radharani in the lap of Kirti Mother. The temple is constructed under the guidance of Jagadguru Shri Kripalu Ji Maharaj.

Radha Madhav Dham 
JKP Radha Madhav Dham is one of the largest Hindu Temple complexes in the Western Hemisphere,<ref name="hua">Vedic Foundation Inaugurated at Barsana Dham, Austin  . Retrieved 15 December 2011.</ref> and the largest in North America.Hylton, H. & Rosie, C. 2006. Insiders' Guide to Austin. Globe Pequot Press.

Philanthropic activities 

Jagadguru Shri Kripalu Ji Maharaj established three free hospitals. The Jagadguru Kripalu Chikitsalaya, Mangarh, the Jagadguru Kripalu Chikitsalaya (Barsana), and the Jagadguru Kripalu Chikitsalaya (Vrindavan) are serving rural populations of 1,000,000 within their catchment radius of 80–100 km each and each treating 600–700 patients daily. The expenses are all borne by Jagadguru Kripalu Parishat. A secular educational Institution is being financed and run by Kripalu's educational trust, Jagadguru Kripalu Parishat Education (JKP Education), which provides underprivileged women and girls free education up to post graduation level. JKP Education runs three colleges for girls in Kunda, Uttar Pradesh (Kripalu Mahila Mahavidyalaya, Kripalu Balika Primary School and Kripalu Balika Intermediate College). Jagadguru Kripalu Parishat also donates money for disaster relief, including Rs. 10 lacs for the aid of Bhuj earthquake victims in 2001, Rs. 25 Lacs for tsunami victims in 2004 and again Rs. 2 Crore for Bihar flood victims in 2008. In May 2013, Kripalu donated Rs.1 crore to the Chief Minister's Relief fund for the victims of the Uttarakhand floods. In 2013, Jagadguru Kripalu Parishat Education president Vishakha Tripathi received the Rajiv Gandhi Excellence Award, the Mother Teresa Excellence Award  and the Nari Shakti Award  for work providing free education to 5000 girls and women in rural India.

Renditions 

Renditions of Jagadguru Shri Kripalu Ji Maharaj's bhajans and kirtans have been recorded by singers such as Manna Dey and Anuradha Paudwal. Anup Jalota, Suresh Wadkar, Kavita Krishnamurthy have also agreed to release several CDs of his compositions.

References

External links 

1922 births
2013 deaths
20th-century Hindu philosophers and theologians
21st-century Hindu philosophers and theologians
Hindi-language poets
Hindu revivalists
Devotees of Krishna
Indian Vaishnavites
Indian theologians
Indian Hindu religious leaders
21st-century Hindu religious leaders
Gaudiya religious leaders
New Age spiritual leaders
Presidents of religious organizations
Scholars from Allahabad
21st-century Indian scholars
20th-century Indian scholars